Meghahatuburu (mentioned in census records as Meghahatuburu Forest village) is a census town in West Singhbhum district of the Indian state of Jharkhand. The town was largely built by the Steel Authority of India Limited as it is the Raw Material Division of SAIL.

Overview
The towns of Meghahatuburu and Kiriburu are contiguous, sharing many local facilities, Meghahatuburu is in West Singhbhum district of Jharkhand

They are differentiated by MIOM and KIOM, the two iron ore mines. Meghahatuburu is a major tourist centre of Jharkhand. It is adjacent to a very dense forest (Saranda) and has streams and mountain ranges. Megahatuburu is very rich in iron ore and many companies are excavating the ore. This place had an annual rainfall of 128cc which has decreased because of the cutting of trees.

List of places
There are many great places to visit in Kiriburu and Meghataburu, some of them are, 
Saranda Forest, Pundul Waterfall, Swapneswar Temple, Khandadhar Waterfall, Sanaghagara Waterfall, etc.

Demographics
 India census, Meghahatuburu Forest village had a population of 6,879. Males constitute 53% of the population and females 47%. Meghahatuburu Forest village has an average literacy rate of 74%, higher than the national average of 59.5%: male literacy is 82%, and female literacy is 66%. In Meghahatuburu Forest village, 13% of the population is under 6 years of age.

Education

Schools 
Kendriya Vidyalaya, Meghahatuburu
Project+2 High School, Meghahatuburu
Project Central School, Kiriburu

References

Iron ore mining in India
Cities and towns in West Singhbhum district